Omri (also Romanized as ‘Omrī, ‘Omarī, and ‘Umri) is a village in Arabkhaneh Rural District, Shusef District, Nehbandan County, South Khorasan Province, Iran. At the 2006 census, its population was 57, in 15 families.

References 

Populated places in Nehbandan County